Rex may refer to:
 Rex (title) (Latin: king, ruler, monarch), a royal title
 King of Rome (Latin: Rex Romae), chief magistrate of the Roman Kingdom

Animals

Dogs
 Rex (dog), once owned by Ronald Reagan
 Rex (search and rescue dog), a dog that received a 1945 Dickin Medal for bravery

Other animals
 -rex, a taxonomic suffix used to describe certain large animals
 Rex (horse) or Rex the Wonder Horse, star of 15 Hollywood motion pictures
 Rex rabbit, a breed of rabbit
 Rex mutation, a type of mutation affecting the fur of the rex rabbit
 One of at least three types of rabbit fur collectively known as "rex fur"

Computing and technology 
 REX prefix, used by the x86-64 instruction encoding
 Rexx (originally named Rex), a computer programming language
 REX, an audio file format; see REX2
 .rex (disambiguation), file extension used by Rexx scripts and REX2 audio files
 REX 5000, a series of personal digital assistants
 REX 6000, a series of personal digital assistants
 Rex (software), a remote execution, configuration management and software deployment system
 Rex (video game), a 1988 game for the ZX Spectrum and Amstrad CPC
 REX OS, a real-time operating system developed by Qualcomm
 Samsung REX, a series of affordable feature phones
 REX, an abbreviation for "request to exit", a push-button or motion detector used for access control

Energy and fuels 
 Rockies Express Pipeline, a natural gas pipeline built across the United States
 Rex Energy, a defunct company engaged in natural gas exploration
 Rex International Holding Limited, an oil and gas company headquartered in Singapore

Fictional characters

Film 
 Rex Lewis, a character from G.I. Joe: The Rise of Cobra
 Rex Manning, the former 80s pop idol in the 1995 film Empire Records
 Rex (Toy Story), a toy dinosaur character from Disney/Pixar's Toy Story series
 Rex, the sheepdog from the 1995 Academy Award-winning film Babe
 Rex, a Tyrannosaurus Rex, a character in animated film We're Back! A Dinosaur's Story
 Rex Kwon Do, a martial arts choreographer in the 2004 cult film Napoleon Dynamite
 Rex, Lori's boss in the film Ted
 Rex Motion Picture Company, was an early film production company in the United States from 1910 into 1917
 Rex (film), alternative name for Megan Leavey, 2017

Animated television series 
 Rex Banner, a one-time character in The Simpsons appearing in the episode "Homer vs. the Eighteenth Amendment"
 Rex Raptor, a recurring character in the 4kids version of Yu-Gi-Oh!
 Rex Salazar, the main title character from the animated show Generator Rex
 Rex, the title character in the claymation series Rex the Runt
 Captain Rex, the clone trooper captain who served as General Anakin Skywalker's second-in-command in the series Star Wars: The Clone Wars

Live-action television series 
 Rex Balsom, a character on the soap opera One Life to Live
 Rex Brady, a character on the soap opera Days of Our Lives
 Rex Buckland, a character in the series Charmed
 Rex (police dog), a fictional character from the police drama television series Inspector Rex
 Rex (Slovak TV series), a 2017 series based on the Austrian original
 Rex Van de Kamp, a character in the series Desperate Housewives
 Rex Britten, a character in the series Awake
 Rex Powers, a dummy in the series Victorious
 Rex, a canine character in the Canadian police procedural drama series Hudson & Rex

Other fiction 
 Rex (NX Files), a character in the action adventure web-show NX Files
 Metal Gear REX, a mecha from the video game Metal Gear Solid
 Rex the Wonder Dog, a DC Comics superhero dog
 Rex Morgan, M.D., a comic strip and its title character
 Rex, the main protagonist and player character from the video game Xenoblade Chronicles 2
 Lord Rex, a super evolve Vivosaur character from the sequel video game Fossil Fighters: Champions
 Rex Mason, a DC Comics superhero known as Metamorpho

Music 
 Rex (musical), a stage musical, with music by Richard Rodgers and lyrics by Sheldon Harnick
 Rex (band), an alternative rock band
 Rex (Live at the Fillmore), a 2008 album by Keller Williams, Keith Moseley and Jeff Austin
 Rex Records (disambiguation), several record companies
 Rex Orange County, an English recording artist and songwriter

People 
 Rex (given name), for people with the given name
 Rex (surname), for people with the surname
 Rex (artist), American gay pornographic artist
 Rex (singer), Li Xinyi (born 1998), Chinese singer and songwriter
 Mad Dog Rex, professional wrestler from All-Star Wrestling

Places 
 Rex, Georgia, an unincorporated community in the United States
 Rex, North Carolina, a census-designated place in the United States
 Rex River, Washington, United States
 Mount Rex, an isolated mountain in Antarctica

Transportation

Air 
 Dudek Rex, a Polish paraglider design
 Rex Airlines, an Australian airline
 The IATA airport code for the General Lucio Blanco International Airport in Reynosa, Mexico
 Reporting name for the Kawanishi N1K Japanese Fighter

Land 
 BMW i3 REx, range extender variant of the all-electric BMW i3
 Subaru Rex, a Japanese Kei car
 Subaru Impreza WRX, a car referred to as "Rex"
 Rex-Acme, a premier British motorcycle company of early 1900s, originally Rex
 Rex (automobile) of Detroit, c. 1914 
 Rex-Simplex and Rex, brand names used by the German company Hering & Richard which produced motor vehicles between 1901 and 1923

Sea 
 SS Rex, an Italian luxury ship, sunk by Allied bombers off the coast of Slovenia in 1944
 SS Rex, a floating casino off the coast of Southern California from the late 1930s to the late 1940s, run by mobster Anthony Cornero

Other uses 
 Rex parade, of the Carnival season in New Orleans
 Rex, king of the New Orleans Mardi Gras Carnival
 Rex Architecture P.C., an architecture and design firm based in New York City, United States
 Rex 84, a plan by the United States to test their ability to detain large numbers of American citizens
 Rex (chair), a foldable chair
 Rex, the dinosaur mascot of the Calgary Dinos athletic teams at the University of Calgary
 MP412 REX, a Russian handgun
 REX, the Regents External Degree program, a former name of Excelsior College
 Rex Center, a former building in Lowell, Massachusetts
 Oligosaccharide reducing-end xylanase, an enzyme
 REX (New Horizons), a radio science experiment on the Pluto flyby space probe

See also 
 Port Rex Technical High School , a technical high school in South Africa
 Rex Cinema (disambiguation)
 Rex Theatre (disambiguation)
 Rexist Party, a fascist political movement and ideology in Belgium
 T. rex (disambiguation)